The 1995 Paris Open was a men's tennis tournament played on indoor carpet courts that was part of the ATP Championship Series, Single Week of the 1995 ATP Tour. It was the 23rd edition of the tournament and took place at the Palais omnisports de Paris-Bercy in Paris, France, from 30 October through 6 November 1995. First-seeded Pete Sampras won the singles title and as a result regained his ATP world No. 1 ranking.

Finals

Singles

 Pete Sampras defeated  Boris Becker, 7–6(7–5), 6–4, 6–4
 It was Sampras' 5th singles title of the year and 36th of his career.

Doubles

 Grant Connell /  Patrick Galbraith defeated  Jim Grabb /  Todd Martin, 6–2, 6–2

References

External links
 ATP tournament profile